Pseudosphex laticincta is a moth of the subfamily Arctiinae. It was described by George Hampson in 1898. It is found in Guatemala.

References

Pseudosphex
Moths described in 1898
Arctiinae of South America